Giuseppe Serembe (Arbërisht: Zef Serembe; 6 March 1844 – 31 December 1901) was an Arbëresh lyric poet. He has left some of the best poetry collections in Albanian in the 19th century. The atmosphere of despair and tragedy that haunted him throughout his life surfaces time and time again in his verse.

Life
Serembe was born in San Cosmo Albanese, in the Calabrian Province of Cosenza, and studied at the college of Saint Adrian. At an early age, he fell in love with a girl from his native village who emigrated to Brazil with her family and subsequently died.
Obsessed by this loss and by the thought of finding at least her grave, Serembe set sail for Brazil in 1874 in search of a new life. With the help of a letter of recommendation from Dora d'Istria, he was received at the court of Pedro II of Brazil. After a brief love affair there, he returned to Europe, disappointed and dejected. On his arrival in the Old World in September 1875 his fortunes took yet another turn for the worse. Robbed of all his money, apparently in the port of Marseille, he was forced to return to Italy on foot, and is said to have lost many of his manuscripts on the way. In Livorno, Demetrio Camarda provided him with a train fare for the rest of his journey back to Cosenza. Despair, arising no doubt from chronic depression or some other form of psychic disorder, accompanied Serembe wherever he went and rendered him solitary and insecure. He took refuge in the dream of the land of his forefathers, a vision marred by the reality of Turkish occupation in Albania and by the indifference of the Western powers to its sufferings. In his emotional isolation, Italy became more and more the foreign land  to Serembe. In 1886, he visited Arbëresh settlements in Sicily and in 1893 travelled to the United States where he lived for about two years.

A volume of his Italian verse was published in New York in 1895. In 1897, he emigrated from his native Calabria to South America a second time and tried to start a new life in Buenos Aires, Argentina. The following year he fell ill and died in 1901 in São Paulo, Brazil.

Works
Many of Serembe's works (poetry, drama and a translation of the Psalms of David), which he constantly altered and revised, were lost in the course of his unsettled existence. During his lifetime he published the following: 
Italian poetry and original songs translated from the Albanian in Italian and Albanian, Cosenza 1883;
The returning soldier, lyric ballad,, New York 1895 verse in Italian only,
Various Sonets, Naples 1890s, an extremely rare collection of forty-two Italian sonnets with an introduction, all crammed onto four pages of tiny print.
A poem appeared in Giuseppe Schirò's journal Young Albania on 31 March 1887.
Thirty-nine of his Albanian poems, published posthumously in Verses (Milan 1926), by his nephew Cosmo Serembe.

Other works have been found in various archives and manuscripts in recent years and some of his poems indeed survived in oral transmission among the villagers of San Cosmo Albanese. This sign of his popularity at home is rather surprising in view of the fact that he spent much of his life away from his native village.

Writing style
Serembe's verse, despondent and melancholic in character, and yet often patriotic and idealistic in inspiration, is considered by many to rank among the best lyric poetry ever produced in Albanian, at least before modern times. His themes range from melodious lyrics on love to eulogies on his native land (be it Italy, land of his birth, or Albania, land of his dreams), elegant poems on friendship and the beauties of nature, and verse of religious inspiration. Among his romantic poems of nostalgic nationalism, which cement the literary link with the rising generation of Rilindja poets in nineteenth-century Albania, are lyrics dedicated to his lost homeland, to Ali Pasha Tepelena, Dora d'Istria and Domenico Mauro. Patriot though he may have been, Serembe was not an intellectual poet who could provide us with a poetic chronicle of Albania's past. He was a poet of sentiment, primarily of solitude and disillusionment.

External links 
Serembe's works: text, concordances and frequency list (English and Albanian)

Albanian-language poets
Arbëreshë people
Albanian-language writers
Activists of the Albanian National Awakening
Albanian activists
1844 births
1901 deaths
19th-century poets